Brian Diego Fuentes (born 4 March 1976) is a former professional Argentine football (soccer) player.

Career
He formerly played for Selangor FA in Malaysian Premier League, helping Selangor win the treble (Premier League, FA Cup and Malaysia Cup) in 2005, as well as winning Golden Boot as league's top scorer in the previous year.

References

External links
 
  

Living people
1976 births
Footballers from Buenos Aires
Argentine sportspeople of Spanish descent
Argentine footballers
Expatriate footballers in Italy
Expatriate footballers in Malaysia
Expatriate footballers in Mexico
Expatriate footballers in Uruguay
Expatriate footballers in Venezuela
Club Atlético Banfield footballers
Arsenal de Sarandí footballers
Nueva Chicago footballers
Club Almagro players
Club Atlético River Plate (Montevideo) players
Talleres de Remedios de Escalada footballers
Deportivo Morón footballers
Cruz Azul footballers
Calcio Foggia 1920 players
C.F. União players
Selangor FA players
Argentine expatriate footballers
Argentine expatriate sportspeople in Italy
Argentine expatriate sportspeople in Mexico
Association football forwards